Captain Keith A. Petty is an American lawyer and officer in the United States Army. He is notable for being appointed to serve as one of the prosecutors on the Guantanamo military commissions, and has taken his arguments to the press.

According to Michelle Shephard, of the Toronto Star, Petty has written and stated:

Petty wrote an article for the May 2008 Middle East Institute entitled: Carnival of Justice: Military Commissions & Guantanamo Bay, where he claimed the commissions process "...is by any legal standards quite fair."
He wrote:

"But it seems that the commissions' proceedings are merely a sideshow in this carnival-like atmosphere."

Education
{| class="wikitable" border="1"
|+ Higher education
|-
| B.A. || Indiana University
|-
| J.D. || Case Western Reserve University
|-
| LL.M. || Georgetown University Law Center
|}

Legal career

The positions Petty has held in his legal career include:
Trial Chambers of the International Criminal Tribunal for the Former Yugoslavia;
Assistant Professor of the War Crimes Prosecution Lab, Case Western Reserve University, School of Law;
Brigade Judge Advocate, Baghdad
Prosecutor in the Office of Military Commissions.

References

Guantanamo Military Commission Prosecutors
United States Army Judge Advocate General's Corps
United States Army officers
Living people
Year of birth missing (living people)